The Providence Bruins are a professional ice hockey team in the American Hockey League (AHL), and are the primary development team for the Boston Bruins of the National Hockey League (NHL). They play at the Amica Mutual Pavilion in Providence, Rhode Island.

History
The Providence Bruins began operation for the start of the 1992–93 AHL season after Providence mayor Buddy Cianci negotiated a deal with the owners of the Maine Mariners franchise, Frank DuRoss and Ed Anderson, to relocate their club. The move saw AHL hockey return to Providence for the first time since the Providence Reds, a founding member of the AHL, left town in 1977.

The Bruins captured their first AHL Calder Cup in the 1999 playoffs, after a regular season in which they dominated the league with 56 regular season wins. Led by rookie head coach Peter Laviolette and paced by Les Cunningham Award  winner Randy Robitaille, the Bruins went from only 19 victories the previous season, to dropping the Rochester Americans four games to one to skate away with the league championship.

In the 2001–02 season, the Providence Bruins contracted with then-13-year-old musician Ben Schwartz to work as the official organist at all home games. As a result, Schwartz, who provided music for seven years until the conclusion of the 2007–08 season, is the youngest organist to ever work for a professional North American sports franchise in history.

In August 2006, DuRoss sold his majority interest in the club to Massachusetts businessman H. Larue Renfroe.

After the 2019–20 season was curtailed due to the COVID-19 pandemic, the Bruins moved to a temporary home in the New England Sports Center in Marlborough, Massachusetts, as the Dunkin' Donuts Center was being used by the state of Rhode Island for pandemic-related operations. The New England Sport Center is also owned by team owner H. Larue Renfroe. The Bruins returned to the Dunkin' Donuts Center for the 2021–22 AHL season.

In September 2022, the home arena was renamed to Amica Mutual Pavilion. 

This market was previously served by:
Providence Reds (1926–1977)

Season-by-season results

Records as of the 2021–22 AHL season.

Players

Current roster
Updated March 17, 2023.

|}

Team captains

Keith McCambridge, 2000–2002
Rich Brennan, 2002–2004
Jay Henderson, 2004–2005
Sean Curry, 2005–2006
Nate Thompson, 2006–2008
Jeremy Reich, 2008–2009
Trent Whitfield, 2009–2010
Jeremy Reich, 2010–2011
Trent Whitfield, 2011–2013
Mike Moore, 2013–2014
Craig Cunningham, 2014–2015
Tommy Cross, 2015–2018
Jordan Szwarz, 2018–2019
Paul Carey, 2019–2021
Josiah Didier, 2022–present

Notable alumni
List of Providence Bruins alumni who played more than 100 games in Providence and 100 or more games in the National Hockey League:

Franchise records and leaders

Single season
Goals: Tim Sweeney, 41, (1992–93)
Assists: Randy Robitaille, 74, (1998–99)
Points: Randy Robitaille, 102, (1998–99)
Penalty minutes: Aaron Downey, 407, (1997–98)
GAA: Tim Thomas, 1.84, (2003–04)
SV%: Tim Thomas, .941, (2003–04)

Career
Career goals: Andy Hilbert, 101, (2001–2005)
Career assists: Andy Hilbert, 109, (2001–2005)
Career points: Andy Hilbert, 210, (2001–2005)
Career penalty minutes: Aaron Downey, 1059, (1997–2000, 2007)
Career goaltending wins: Zane McIntyre, 86, (2015–2019)
Career shutouts: Zane McIntyre (2015–2019), 11 
Career games: Jay Henderson, 278, (1998–2003, 2004–2005)

Scoring leaders
These are the top-ten point-scorers for the Providence Bruins in the AHL. Figures are updated after each completed season.

Note: Pos = Position; GP = Games played; G = Goals; A = Assists; Pts = Points; P/G = Points per game;  = current Providence player

References

External links
Providence Bruins Official Website
The Internet Hockey Database – Providence Bruins

 
1
Ice hockey teams in Rhode Island
Sports in Providence, Rhode Island
Ice hockey clubs established in 1992
1992 establishments in Rhode Island